Peter Thorndike (born October 4, 1977) is an American snowboarder. He competed in the men's parallel giant slalom event at the 2002 Winter Olympics, scoring 27th place in the event.

References

External links
 

1977 births
Living people
American male snowboarders
Olympic snowboarders of the United States
Snowboarders at the 2002 Winter Olympics
Sportspeople from Concord, New Hampshire
20th-century American people
21st-century American people